Mibolerone, also known as dimethylnortestosterone (DMNT) and sold under the brand names Cheque Drops and Matenon, is a synthetic, orally active, and extremely potent anabolic–androgenic steroid (AAS) and a 17α-alkylated nandrolone (19-nortestosterone) derivative which was marketed by Upjohn for use as a veterinary drug. It was indicated specifically as an oral treatment for prevention of estrus (heat) in adult female dogs.

Side effects

Pharmacology

Pharmacodynamics
Mibolerone has both higher affinity and greater selectivity for the androgen receptor (AR) than does the related potent AAS metribolone (17α-methyl-19-nor-δ9,11-testosterone), although potent and significant progestogenic activity remains present. However, another study found that mibolerone and metribolone had similar affinity for the progesterone receptor (PR) but that mibolerone only had around half the affinity of metribolone for the AR.

Chemistry

Mibolerone, also known as 7α,17α-dimethyl-19-nortestosterone (DMNT) or as 7α,17α-dimethylestr-4-en-17β-ol-3-one, is a synthetic estrane steroid and a 17α-alkylated derivative of nandrolone (19-nortestosterone). It is the 17α-methyl derivative of trestolone (7α-methyl-19-nortestosterone; MENT). Other related AAS include metribolone (17α-methyl-δ9,11-19-nortestosterone) and dimethyltrienolone (7α,17α-dimethyl-δ9,11-19-nortestosterone).

Synthesis
Nandrolone (1) appears to be used to make mibolerone. For comparison, also see bolasterone and calusterone. The first step involves extending the conjugation of the enone function by an additional double bond. Chloranil (tetrachloroquinone) is the forerunner of dichlorodicyanoquinone (DDQ), a reagent used extensively for introducing additional unsaturation in the progestin and corticoid series.

In the case at hand, heating acetate (1) with chloranil gives the conjugated dienone (2), and reaction of that compound with methylmagnesium bromide in the presence of cuprous chloride leads to addition of the methyl group to position 7 at the end of the conjugated system (3). The stereochemistry of the product again illustrates the preference for additions from the backside. The alcohol at C17 is then oxidized to a ketone (4). Enamines are commonly used to activate adjacent functions; they are also not infrequently used, as in this case, as protecting groups. Thus, reaction of the intermediate with pyrrolidine gives dienamine (5). This transformation emphasizes the clear difference in reactivity between ketones at C7 and C17. A second methyl Grignard addition gives the corresponding 17α-methyl derivative. Hydrolysis of the enamine function then affords mibolerone (6).

The same structure of 3 and 4 also containing an 11β-fluoro group has also been described in the patent literature.

History
Mibolerone was first synthesized in 1963.

Society and culture

Generic names
It is also known as dimethylnortestosterone (DMNT) and by its former developmental code name U-10997.

Brand names
Mibolerone has been marketed under the brand names Cheque Drops and Matenon.

References

External links
 Cheque Drops (mibolerone) - William Llewellyn's Anabolic.org 

Abandoned drugs
Tertiary alcohols
Androgens and anabolic steroids
Estranes
Hepatotoxins
Enones
Progestogens
World Anti-Doping Agency prohibited substances